In grammar, the term particle (abbreviated ) has a traditional meaning, as a part of speech that cannot be inflected, and a modern meaning, as a function word associated with another word or phrase, generally in order to impart meaning. Although a particle may have an intrinsic meaning, and indeed may fit into other grammatical categories, the fundamental idea of the particle is to add context to the sentence, expressing a mood or indicating a specific action. In English, for instance, the phrase "oh well" has no purpose in speech other than to convey a mood. The word 'up' would be a particle in the phrase to 'look up' (as in the phrase "look up this topic"), implying that one researches something, rather than literally gazing skywards. Many languages use particles, in varying amounts and for varying reasons. In Hindi, for instance, they may be used as honorifics, or to indicate emphasis or negation. In some languages they are more clearly defined, such as Chinese, which has three types of zhùcí (助詞; particles): Structural, Aspectual, and Modal. Structural particles are used for grammatical relations. Aspectual particles signal grammatical aspects. Modal particles express linguistic modality. Polynesian languages, which are almost devoid of inflection, use particles extensively to indicate mood, tense, and case.

Modern meaning 
 Particles are typically words that encode grammatical categories (such as negation, mood, tense, or case), clitics, fillers or (oral) discourse markers such as well, um, etc. Particles are never inflected.

Related concepts and ambiguities

Depending on context, the meaning of the term may overlap with concepts such as morpheme, marker, or even adverb as in English phrasal verbs such as out in get out. Under a strict definition, in which a particle must be uninflected, English deictics like this and that would not be classed as such (since they have plurals and are therefore inflected), and neither would Romance articles (since they are inflected for number and gender).

This assumes that any function word incapable of inflection is by definition a particle. However, this conflicts with the above statement that particles have no specific lexical function , since non-inflecting words that function as articles, prepositions, conjunctions, interjections have a clear lexical function. This disappears if particles are taken to be a separate class of words, where one characteristic (which they share with some words of other classes) is that they do not inflect.

In English
Particle is a somewhat nebulous term for a variety of small words that do not conveniently fit into other classes of words. The Concise Oxford Companion to the English Language defines a particle as a "word that does not change its form through inflection and does not fit easily into the established system of parts of speech". The term includes the "adverbial particles" like up or out in verbal idioms (phrasal verbs) such as "look up" or "knock out"; it also includes the "infinitival particle" to, the "negative particle" not, the "imperative particles" do and let, and sometimes "pragmatic particles" (also called "fillers" or "discourse markers") like oh and well.

In other languages

Afrikaans 
The following particles can be considered the most prominent in Afrikaans:
 nie2: Afrikaans has a double negation system, as in Sy is nie1 moeg nie2 'She is not tired PTCL.NEG' (meaning 'She is not tired'). The first nie1 is analysed as an adverb, while the second nie2 as a negation particle.
 te: Infinitive verbs are preceded by the complementiser om and the infinitival particle te, e.g. Jy moet onthou om te eet 'You must remember for COMP PTCL.INF eat' (meaning 'You must remember to eat').
 se or van: Both se and van are genitive particles, e.g. Peter se boek 'Peter PTCL.GEN book' (meaning 'Peter's book'), or die boek van Peter 'the book PTCL.GEN Peter' (meaning 'Peter's book').
 so and soos: These two particles are found in constructions like so groot soos 'n huis 'PTCL.CMPR big PTCL.CMPR a house' (meaning 'as big as a house').

Arabic 
Particles in Arabic can take the form of a single root letter before a given word, like "-و" (and), "-ف" (so) and "-ل" (to). However, other particles like "هل" (which marks a question) can be complete words as well.

Chinese 

There are three types of zhùcí (助詞; particles) in Chinese: Structural, Aspectual, and Modal. Structural particles are used for grammatical relations. Aspectual particles signal grammatical aspects. Modal particles express linguistic modality. Note that particles are different from zhùdòngcí (助動詞; modal verbs) in Chinese.

Hindi 
There are different types of particles present in Hindi. Emphatic particles, limiter particles, negation particles, affirmative particles, honorific particles, topic-marker particle and case-marking particles. Some common particles of Hindi are mentioned in the table below:

German
A German modal particle serves no necessary syntactical function, but expresses the speaker's attitude towards the utterance. Modal particles include ja, halt, doch, aber, denn, schon and others. Some of these also appear in non-particle forms. Aber, for example, is also the conjunction but. In Er ist Amerikaner, aber er spricht gut Deutsch, "He is American, but he speaks German well," aber is a conjunction connecting two sentences. But in Er spricht aber gut Deutsch!, the aber is a particle, with the sentence perhaps best translated as "What good German he speaks!" These particles are common in speech but rarely found in written language, except that which has a spoken quality (such as online messaging).

Turkish
Turkish particles have no meaning alone; among other words, it takes part in the sentence. In some sources, exclamations and conjunctions are also considered Turkish particles. In this article, exclamations and conjunctions will not be dealt with, but only Turkish particles. The main particles used in Turkish are:

 ancak
 başka, another
 beri, since
 bir, one
 bir tek, only
 dair, regarding
 doğru, right
 değil, not
 değin, mention
 denli, as much
 dek, until

 dolayı, due
 diye, so
 evvel, before
 gayri, informal
 gibi, like
 göre, by
 için, for
 ile, with
 kadar, until
 karşı, against
 karşın, although or despite

 mukabil, corresponding
 önce, prior to
 ötürü, due to
 öte, beyond
 rağmen, despite
 sadece, only
 sanki, as if
 sonra, then
 sıra, row
 üzere, to
 yalnız, alone

Particles can be used with the simple form of the names to which they are attached or in other cases. Some of particles uses with attached form, and some particles are always used after the relevant form. For examples, "-den ötürü", "-e dek", "-den öte", "-e doğru":

 Bu çiçekleri annem için alıyorum. ("anne" is nominative)
 Yarına kadar bu ödevi bitirmem lazım. (dative)
 Düşük notlarından ötürü çok çalışman gerekiyor. (ablative)

Turkish particles according to their functions. Başka, gayrı, özge used for other, another, otherwise, new, diverse, either 
 Senden gayrı kimsem yok. No one other than you.
 Yardım istemekten başka çaremiz kalmadı. We have no choice but to ask for help.

Göre, nazaran, dâir, rağmen used for by, in comparison, about, despite.
 Çok çalışmama rağmen sınavda hedeflediğim başarıyı yakalayamadım.
 Duyduğuma göre bitirme sınavları bir hafta erken gerçekleşecekmiş.
 Şirketteki son değişikliklere dâir bilgi almak istiyorum.

İçin, üzere, dolayı, ötürü, nâşi, diye used for for, with, because, because of, how.
 Açılış konuşmasını yapmak üzere kürsüye çıktı.
 Bu raporu bitirebilmek için zamana ihtiyacım var.
 Kardeşim hastalığından nâşi gelemedi.

Japanese and Korean

The term particle is often used in descriptions of Japanese and Korean, where they are used to mark nouns according to their grammatical case or thematic relation in a sentence or clause. Linguistic analyses describe them as suffixes, clitics, or postpositions. There are sentence-tagging particles such as Japanese and Chinese question markers.

Polynesian languages
Polynesian languages are almost devoid of inflection, and use particles extensively to indicate mood, tense, and case. Suggs, discussing the deciphering of the rongorongo script of Easter Island, describes them as all-important. In Māori for example, the versatile particle "e" can signal the imperative mood, the vocative case, the future tense, or the subject of a sentence formed with most passive verbs. The particle "i" signals the past imperfect tense, the object of a transitive verb or the subject of a sentence formed with "neuter verbs" (a form of passive verb), as well as the prepositions in, at and from.

Tokelauan
In Tokelauan, ia is used when describing personal names, month names, and nouns used to describe a collaborative group of people participating in something together. It also can be used when a verb does not directly precede a pronoun to describe said pronouns. Its use for pronouns is optional but mostly in this way. Ia cannot be used if the noun it is describing follows any of the prepositions e, o, a, or ko. A couple of the other ways unrelated to what is listed above that ia is used is when preceding a locative or place name. However, if ia is being used in this fashion, the locative or place name must be the subject of the sentence. Another particle in Tokelauan is a, or sometimes ā. This article is used before a person's name as well as the names of months and the particle a te is used before pronouns when these instances are following the prepositions i or ki. Ia te is a particle used if following the preposition mai.

See also 
 Nobiliary particle
 Sentence-final particle
 Uninflected word
 Ilocano particles
 Okinawan particles
 Proto-Indo-European particles

Notes

References 

Parts of speech